is a Japanese idol, singer, actor, radio host, artist, dancer, and choreographer. He is the lead vocalist and leader of the boy band Arashi, hence his nickname .

Ohno began his career in the entertainment industry when he joined the Japanese talent agency Johnny & Associates in 1994 at the age of 13. He started an acting career in 1997 when he was cast to be part of the stage play Kyo to Kyo. In 2008, Ohno became the first and the only artist from Johnny's to hold his own art exhibition, titled "Freestyle", and also received his first starring role in a Japanese television drama, Maō, for which he earned a handful of Best Actor awards. Since then, he has continued to star in numerous dramas and movies, receiving a number of awards and nominations for his roles. For his work as an artist, a singer, and an actor in Kaibutsu-kun the Movie, Ohno became one of the recipients of GQ Japan's Men of the Year Award in 2011.

Early life 
Ohno was born in Mitaka, Tokyo as the youngest child of his family. He has one older sister. During middle school, his mother sent in his application to Johnny & Associates without his knowledge. An invitation to audition was sent back to Ohno, and he subsequently became a trainee in October 1994. To focus on the stage play Kyo to Kyo, which ran from 1997 to 1998 during his trainee days, he withdrew from high school and moved to Kyoto.

Music career 

Before his music debut with Arashi, Ohno wanted to resign from Johnny & Associates. However, then-president Johnny Kitagawa asked him to help out with a song recording and to pack up for a trip to Hawaii, which turned out to be the place where the press conference announcing the formation of Arashi was held. Since much of his trainee days were spent in Kyoto, he was the least known member during Arashi's early days.

Ohno is the lead vocalist of Arashi. Although his music career is primarily with Arashi, he had a solo concert called 3104 (which can be read as his name Satoshi in Japanese) in 2006 and in 2009, became the first and only member in Arashi to release a solo single. It was a soundtrack for his drama Uta no Onii-san titled  by Yano Kenta starring Satoshi Ohno. Ohno also provided the vocals to the insert song , which was released as a single on July 7, 2010 for the drama Kaibutsu-kun and sold around 59,000 copies on the first day.

Choreography 

Ohno began his work as a choreographer in 2004 for his solo "Top Secret" during Arashi's 2004 Iza, Now Tour and in 2006, began to work as a choreographer for the group. Since then, he has choreographed numerous solo and group dances. Some of his notable choreography work for Arashi includes "Zero-G", the live performance for "Bittersweet", the interlude for the "Kokoro no Sora" music video, "Tsunagu", and "Do You...?".

Acting career

Stage 
In 1997, Ohno was a cast member of Kyo to Kyo with Musical Academy (MA) leader Shingo Machida and continued to act in other stage productions such as Koichi Dōmoto's Mask and Shōnentai's Playzone after Kyo to Kyo was over. Since then, he has done a number of stage plays such as True West with Masahiro Matsuoka and West Side Story with bandmates Sho Sakurai and Jun Matsumoto.

In Tensei Kunpū, Ohno portrayed a man named Kaoru Kazamine who was accidentally sent back to the Edo period of Japan through a system malfunction.

Drama 
In 1999, Ohno made his TV drama debut in the volleyball-centered short drama , which was Arashi's first drama together.

In 2008, Ohno was given his first starring role in the suspense drama Maō. He co-starred with Toma Ikuta and portrayed a two-faced lawyer who sought for revenge against the person who murdered his brother years ago.

In 2009, he starred in his first comedy drama . With Kanjani Eight member Ryuhei Maruyama as his co-star, Ohno played a musician who unexpectedly becomes a singing character for a children's program after being dumped by his girlfriend, kicked out of his band, and labelled useless by his family. Ohno also took part in a television mini-drama project titled , which aired from October 2009 to April 2010 and starred a select number of different artists from Johnny's. Ohno was the lead actor in the first story of the project called , which ran for four episodes in total. The story was about a salaryman and a club hostess visiting a strange "Room 0" that can reveal anyone's "grade" as a human being.

In January 2010, Ohno co-starred with the other members of Arashi in the human suspense drama special . Ohno portrayed Satoru Mashiko, a 28-year-old employee of a cleaning company who is caught up in a building hijack. Beginning in April 2010, Ohno starred in the live-action adaptation of the manga and anime Kaibutsu-kun. Ohno played Tarou Kaibutsu, the prince of Kaibutsu Land who is ordered by the king to go to the world of humans for training as he is deemed unfit for the succession of the throne. He then reprised his role of Kaibutsu-kun for the Kaibutsu-kun special which aired on June 26, 2010. Ohno also starred in the second story, of the Fall 2010  special that aired on October 4, 2010.

In October 2011, Ohno once again reprised his role of Kaibutsu-kun for another Kaibutsu-kun special, leading up to the story of the 3D movie version.

On January 3, 2012, Ohno starred in the drama special . He played the role of Shotaro Tarui, a freeter who can't forget his childhood dream of being a hero. However, he finds himself planning a fake kidnapping after he receives a request from the daughter of a boss of racketeers, played by co-star Yui Aragaki. Beginning in April 2012, Ohno co-starred with Erika Toda in his first Getsuku drama, . He played the lead character, Kei Enomoto, an employee at a major security firm who has an obsession with keys and locks. Enomoto works with a pair of attorneys, solving mysteries that fall under the "locked room" genre, in which seemingly impossible crimes are committed.

On August 24, 2013, Ohno starred in the drama special  which aired as part of the annual 24 Hour Television telethon in Japan. Ohno plays a 29-year-old man named Kouta who is diagnosed with malignant lymphoma. Given three months left to live, he makes a resolve to accept his fate and face death properly.

On January 3, 2014, Ohno reprised the role of Enomoto Kei for the Kagi no Kakatta Heya special. He also starred in the live-action adaptation of the manga Shinigami-kun beginning in April 2014. Ohno portrayed Shinigami-kun (Shinigami No.413) whose job is to pronounce death to expected people and take their souls to the spiritual world. As a rookie reaper, he tends to make biased decisions towards the human side which always causes him to be reprimanded by his boss.

Beginning in April 2016, Ohno starred in a drama titled . Ohno played Reiji Samejima, a company president in the hotel industry. Despite his success at work, he knows little about love. This romantic comedy follows Samejima as he pursues Misaki Shibayama, his very first love interest.

Film 
In 2002, Ohno made his motion picture debut in Arashi's first movie together, . He portrayed Haru, a bizarre high school student who gets swindled during his trip to Harajuku. Two years later in 2004, Ohno reprised his role for the sequel . Ohno reprised his role as Haru once again in 2014 in a spin-off of the two previous films, titled .

In 2007, the group came together once again to act in their third movie together, with Ohno acting as an oil painter.

In 2011, Ohno returned to the big screen starring as the lead actor in the film Kaibutsu-kun the Movie. His character, Tarou Kaibutsu, is about to be crowned king, but is met with unexpected booing. Trying to escape to the human world, Tarou and his three henchmen accidentally find themselves in a place known as the Curry Kingdom where he is mistaken as a legendary hero. The cast went overseas to India to shoot parts of the film. He became the first member in Arashi to star in a 3D film.

In May 2016, it was announced that Ohno will star as the lead actor in the film , set to premier in summer 2017. Mumon: The Land of Stealth illustrates the epic battle between the Oda clan and the Iga ninja. Ohno plays Mumon, an Iga ninja renowned to be a deadly assassin with unmatched battle strength, but who is also equally lazy and only seeks to earn money to make his wife, Okuni, happy. In preparation for the film, Ohno underwent intensive training in sword fighting.

Other ventures

Radio 
Ohno had his own radio show called Arashi Discovery, which aired every weekday from Monday to Friday on FM Yokohama from October 1, 2002, to March 31, 2017.

Art 
When Ohno was in the third grade, he was inspired by his classmate's Dragon Ball illustration to start drawing. Since then, he has been drawing his own artwork and making original figurines. In 2008, he held an art exhibition called Freestyle, making him the first artist in Johnny's to hold one. In 2015, it was announced that Ohno would be holding a second art exhibition called Freestyle II in Tokyo from July 24 to August 23. In addition, Ohno held an art exhibition the same year in Shanghai from July 9 to 29, showcasing artwork from his first art exhibition, Freestyle. A new version of Freestyle, called Freestyle 2020 opened on September 9, 2020, and had pieces from his previous exhibitions, as well as new ones, including the cover art for Arashi's single "Kite".

Because of his talent in the field of art, Ohno was appointed to host a four episode documentary for NHK entitled "Jakuchu Miracle World" starting on April 25, 2011. The documentary focused on analyzing artwork by a famous Edo era artist named Itō Jakuchū. On August 22, 2012, Ohno hosted another documentary for NHK entitled "Everything Is for the Sake Of Delivering Dreams ~Walt Disney Trajectory of Creation~". In commemoration of Walt Disney's 110th anniversary, the documentary explored and revealed the secrets behind the origins and processes of Walt's creations.

As of 2019, Ohno has designed the charity T-shirt for NTV's 24-hour television telethon four times, making him the first artist to do so. He was in charge of designing the T-shirt for the first time in 2004. In 2012, Ohno collaborated with Japanese artist Yoshitomo Nara and their design sold 764,198 copies, setting a new record. In the following year, Ohno collaborated with Japanese artist Yayoi Kusama to design the T-shirt for that year's telethon. It sold 1,244,469 copies, making it the most successful in the history of the telethon. 2019 was the 2nd time he designed it by himself (各回の色とデザイン).

Commercials 
大野智#CM
 Kentucky Fried Chicken Japan
Red Hot Chicken (2010-2011)
Habanero Boneless (2010)
Jalapeno Boneless (2011)
 Kracie Home Products  "Naive"  brand skin care 
 Morinaga Confectionaries and Health Foods Industry
 Morinaga small chocolate biscuit (October 2011-March 2014)
 Bake creamy <melting cheese brulee> (October 2012-March 2014)
 Baked chocolate "Bake" series (April 2014-May 2016)
 Morinaga Milk Cocoa (October 2014-September 2016)
 Lawson
 Onigiri-ya (November 2012-May 2015)
 Handmade pasta (October 2014-May 2015)
 Golden chicken umami salt (October 2014-May 2015)
 Hisamitsu Pharmaceutical Allegra FX  (January 2013- )
 Kirin Company, Ltd.
 Kirin Beverages Company, Ltd.
 "Mets Cola", with Masaki Aiba  (December 2013-February 2016)
 "Mets", with Masaki Aiba and Jun Matsumoto (March 2016-November 2016)
 Ajinomoto
 J-Oil Mills' Ajinomoto extra virgin olive oil (February 2017- )
 McDonald's Japan (September 2019-December 2019)
 Asahi Group Holdings, Ltd.
 Asahi Soft Drinks "Mitsuya Cider" (2020) with Arashi as a group, including a video of Sho Sakurai with audio from him

Discography

Singles

Other charted songs

Publications 
 Freestyle (published on February 8, 2008 by M.Co.)
 Freestyle II (published on July 24, 2015 by M.Co.)
 Freestyle 2020 (published on September 20, 2020 by M.Co.)

Filmography

TV dramas

Films

Documentaries
 Jakuchu Miracle World (NHK, 2011, navigator)
 Subete wa yume o todokeru tame ni ~ Walt Disney sōzō no kiseki ~ (NHK, 2012, navigator)

Stage

Awards and nominations

Notes

References

External links 
J Storm Profile
Satoshi Ohno | Johnny's Net Profile
 

1980 births
Living people
Arashi members
People from Mitaka, Tokyo
Male actors from Tokyo
Musicians from Western Tokyo
Japanese male pop singers
Japanese idols
Japanese male film actors
Japanese male stage actors
Japanese male television actors
Japanese male dancers
Japanese choreographers
Johnny & Associates
20th-century Japanese male actors
20th-century Japanese male singers
20th-century Japanese singers
21st-century Japanese male actors
21st-century Japanese male singers
21st-century Japanese singers